Marvin Davis is a former gridiron football linebacker, defensive lineman and Grey Cup champion.

Davis played his college football at Southern University and began his career in 1974 with the National Football League's Houston Oilers, where he played 13 games as a back-up. He then joined the World Football League's Shreveport Steamer for 1975. In 1976, he moved to Canada with the Montreal Alouettes and was part of their 1977 Grey Cup winning team. He finished his career in 1978 with the Hamilton Tiger-Cats and Winnipeg Blue Bombers.

References

1952 births
Houston Oilers players
Shreveport Steamer players
Montreal Alouettes players
Hamilton Tiger-Cats players
Winnipeg Blue Bombers players
Southern Jaguars football players
African-American players of Canadian football
Living people
Players of American football from Shreveport, Louisiana
Canadian football defensive linemen
Canadian football linebackers
American football linebackers
21st-century African-American people
20th-century African-American sportspeople